Jaya Prakhash Narayan was a student of Gandhi, who founded the Congress of Cultural Freedom in India.

He did not participate in the Indian government, but was well respected by the Indians.

Mr. Hoàng Văn Chí stated his power was as high as Nehru.

Jaya Prakhash Narayan had helped Mr. Hoàng Văn Chí to obtain a grant from the Congress of Cultural Freedom while he was in exile in India to write "From Colonialism to Communism".

Indian National Congress politicians